Electoral district of Moorabbin was an electoral district of the Legislative Assembly in the Australian state of Victoria.

Members for Moorabbin

Election results

See also
 Parliaments of the Australian states and territories
 List of members of the Victorian Legislative Assembly

References

Former electoral districts of Victoria (Australia)
1955 establishments in Australia
1976 disestablishments in Australia